Atteria is a genus of moths belonging to the subfamily Tortricinae of the family Tortricidae.

Species
Atteria docima Druce, 1912
Atteria drucei Walsingham, 1914
Atteria pavimentata Meyrick, 1913
Atteria strigicinctana Walker, 1863
Atteria transversana (Walker, 1863)

See also
List of Tortricidae genera

References

External links
tortricidae.com

Atteriini
Tortricidae genera